Emmaste-Kurisu (until 2017 Kurisu) is a village in Hiiumaa Parish, Hiiu County in northwestern Estonia.

The village is first mentioned in 1798 (Kurriso). Historically, the village was part of Emmaste Manor.

1977-1997 the village was part of Lassi village.

References
 

Villages in Hiiu County